The Juana Rodríguez Morales House, in Cayey, Puerto Rico, at 7 Nuñez Romeu St., is a Spanish Creole-style townhouse built c.1850.  It faces the plaza in the center of town. It was listed on the National Register of Historic Places in 2005.

It has also been known as the Espadi-Cervoni House.

It was home of a wealthy family and is a good example of local vernacular style that is depicted in period paintings.

It is built of timber-frame construction, with mortise-and-tenon joints.

See also
Creole architecture in the United States

References

Houses on the National Register of Historic Places in Puerto Rico
Houses completed in 1850
National Register of Historic Places in Cayey, Puerto Rico
1850 establishments in Puerto Rico
Creole architecture